Keepin' It Real is Craig's Brother's first EP, released on May 10, 1997 through Apple Jacks Records.

Track listing

Personnel 
 Ted Bond - Vocals
 Andy Snyder - Guitar
 Scott Hrapoff - Bass
 Heath Konkel - Drums

References

Craig's Brother albums
1997 EPs